Royal High School may refer to:

United Kingdom
Royal High School, Edinburgh, Scotland
Royal High School, Bath, England
Royal High Primary School, a school in Edinburgh, Scotland

United States
Royal High School (California), Simi Valley, California
Royal High School (Texas), Brookshire, Texas
Royal High School (Washington), Royal City, Washington
Royal Valley High School, Hoyt, Kansas
Royal Palm Beach High School, Royal Palm Beach, Florida

See also
 Royal School (disambiguation)
 Royal Grammar School (disambiguation)